Baratza is a United States-based electric coffee grinder company focusing primarily on consumer-level grinders for use at home. It was founded in 1999 by Kyle Anderson and Kyra Kennedy. It was purchased by Breville in 2020.

References

2. https://www.nytimes.com/wirecutter/reviews/baratza-encore-burr-coffee-grinder-review/

3. https://dailycoffeenews.com/2020/10/02/breville-acquires-us-grinder-maker-baratza-for-60-million/

American companies established in 1999
Coffee appliance vendors